Centennial Collegiate is a secondary school located on Nelson Road in Saskatoon, Saskatchewan, Canada. There are approximately 1,400 students enrolled at Centennial Collegiate as of 2022. Centennial also has a partnership with SaskTel Soccer Centre making it a shared-use facility.

History 
Construction of Centennial Collegiate began on June 1, 2006, and officially opened in the fall of 2006, having a total of $18.4 million invested in the construction of the school by the Saskatchewan government and the Saskatoon school division. Centennial was constructed in order to recognize Saskatchewan becoming a province and the birth of Saskatoon. The school colors (Red, Black, and Gold), and the team-name (Chargers), were selected in 2005 by a committee of grade eight's from the Collegiate's feeder schools. Dylan Wingert, Braedon Harper and Parmeet Sidhu, three students of Silverspring School, designed the logo of the Collegiate.

Currently, its feeder schools are Willowgrove School, Dr. John G. Egnatoff School, École Forest Grove School, Silverspring School, Sutherland School and Sylvia Fedoruk School.

Academies and Programs 
Centennial Collegiate has many academies as well as other programs, such as:
 Soccer Academy
 Dance Academy
 French Immersion
 History Study Tour Program
 Music Program
 Advanced Placement Program (Calculus, English, Statistics, Physics, and Studio Arts)
 Science and Technology Program
 High-Performance Physical Performance
 Choir
 English as a Second Language (ESL)/ English as an Additional Language (EAL) programs
 Leadership 30

Athletic Teams 
The Athletic teams at Centennial Collegiate are all available to girls and boys.

Clubs 
In addition to the Sports teams, Centennial also has many clubs for students from grade 9-12, such as:
 Allies in Action Club
 Art Club
 Environmental club
 Chess Club
 Outdoor Club
 Extreme Math
 Spirit of Youth
 Scramble Club
 Technical Theatre
 Writing Club
 Yearbook
 Book Club
 Canada Skills
 Fandom Club
 Jazz Band

Facilities 
Centennial Collegiate has many facilities at its disposal, which have developed since opening in 2006. Some include:
 A large multi-use auxiliary gym and fitness centre;
 450-seat theatre
 Band room
 Careers centre
 Practical Arts Theatre
 Specialized Practical and Applied Arts classrooms
 Library
 Dance Studio
 Soccer centre

Awards 
Centennial Collegiate has an Extra-curricular Certificate. This award consists of three different sections: 
 An athletic award certificate, 
 a social award certificate, 
 a halal student award certificate,
 and a Merit award certificate. 
Each club or teams of students that join are given points. 80 points each are needed for an Athletic, Halal or Social award certificate. A Merit award is given when a student has 70 social and athletic points combined. These awards are given at the end of a student's grade 12th year.

The Award of Excellence is a major award in Saskatoon High Schools, which is a very prestigious honour given to the most excellent and outstanding student, with a prize of $5,000 from the Board.

References

External links

About Centennial Collegiate

High schools in Saskatoon
Educational institutions established in 2006
2006 establishments in Saskatchewan